Steve Jocz (born 23 July 1981) is a Canadian musician, singer, and songwriter, best known as the former drummer for the Canadian rock band Sum 41.

Early life
Jocz formed Sum 41 in 1996 alongside Deryck Whibley. Jocz graduated from Exeter High School in 1999.

Professional career

Sum 41
In 1999, the band signed an international record deal with Island Records. The band released their debut album, All Killer No Filler in 2001. The band achieved mainstream success with their first single from the album, "Fat Lip", which reached number-one on the Billboard Modern Rock Tracks chart and remains the band's most successful single to date. All Killer No Filler was certified platinum in the United States, Canada and in the UK. The band has since released six more studio albums: Does This Look Infected? (2002), Chuck (2004) Underclass Hero (2007),  Screaming Bloody Murder (2011), 13 Voices (2016) and Order in Decline (2019). The three albums before Screaming Bloody Murder have been certified platinum in Canada.

The band often performs more than 300 times each year and holds long global tours, most of which last more than a year. They have been nominated for seven Juno Awards and have won twice (Group of the Year in 2002 and Rock Album of the Year for Chuck in 2005). Their fifth studio album, Screaming Bloody Murder, was released on March 29, 2011.

On April 18, 2013, he announced on Facebook and Twitter that he had left Sum 41 with no explanation given.

Other appearances
Aside from drums, Jocz plays the piano and guitar. He sings lead vocals for the Sum 41 alter-ego heavy metal band Pain For Pleasure, where the members of Sum 41 would parody a 1980s metal band.

In 2007, Jocz recorded drums for two songs on Avril Lavigne's album, The Best Damn Thing.

In the summer of 2008, Jocz toured with the Vandals on the Vans Warped Tour.

Jocz did again help out The Vandals on drums for some European dates in the summer of 2018.

Discography

Sum 41

 Half Hour of Power (2000)
 All Killer No Filler (2001)
 Does This Look Infected? (2002)
 Does This Look Infected Too? (2003)
 Chuck (2004)
 Go Chuck Yourself (2005)
 Underclass Hero (2007)
 All the Good Shit: 14 Solid Gold Hits 2000-2008  (2009)
 Screaming Bloody Murder (2011)

The Operation M.D.We Have an Emergency (2007)Birds + Bee Stings (2010)

Avril LavigneThe Best Damn Thing (2007) – drums on "One of Those Girls" and "Contagious"

Treble ChargerDetox (2002)

Iggy PopSkull Ring'' (2003) – drums on "Little Know It All"

See also
List of drummers

References

Canadian music video directors
Canadian punk rock drummers
Canadian male drummers
Canadian people of Polish descent
Living people
Musicians from Ontario
People from Ajax, Ontario
Sum 41 members
Canadian atheists
Critics of religions
Canadian percussionists
1981 births